Ariy Moiseyevich Pazovsky (Арий Моисеевич Пазовский) ( in Perm – 6 January 1953 in Moscow), was a Russian Jewish  conductor.

He was a junior conductor at the Bolshoi from 1923–1928, and then director 1943–1948. As a conductor of the Bolshoi Opera, he is credited with having returned parts of Modest Mussorgsky's opera Boris Godunov which had been censored in the Russian Empire. On his arrival in 1943 Pazovsky was required to enliven the repertoire with some 19th-century operas, and thus had to postpone Prokofiev's War and Peace, but made this good with putting on Prokofiev's Cinderella.

References

1887 births
1953 deaths
Saint Petersburg Conservatory alumni
Stalin Prize winners
People's Artists of the USSR
20th-century Russian conductors (music)
Russian male conductors (music)
20th-century Russian male musicians